Nisga'a Highway, officially designated British Columbia Highway 113, is a highway in the Regional District of Kitimat-Stikine in British Columbia. It starts in Terrace at Highway 16. The route provides paved access to the settlements of the Nisga'a Nation -  Gitlaxt'aamiks (New Aiyansh), Gitwinksihlkw (Canyon City), Gingolx (Kincolith), Laxgalts'ap (Greenville), Nass Camp and others. It enters the Nass Country via the valley of Kitsumkalum Lake, which connects from the Skeena and via the Nisga'a Lava Beds Provincial Park. There is a  spur between New Aiyansh and Nass Camp.

The 29 kilometre section of the highway between Laxgalts'ap and Gingolx opened on 17 May 2003 at a cost of $34 million (equivalent to 49.74 million in 2022). Before the road, the only ways into Gingolx were via boat or floatplane.

The route received a newly designed shield and was given the numeric designation of Provincial Highway 113 in Summer 2006. The number 113 was assigned due to its historical significance to the Nisga'a. In 1887, a Nisga'a chief traveled to Victoria to meet with provincial government representatives, demanding self-government. The Nisga'a Final Agreement was passed in Parliament 113 years later in 2000.

See also
 Atlin Road

References

External links

British Columbia provincial highways
Nass Country
2006 establishments in British Columbia